Hal Evan Sutton (born April 28, 1958) is an American professional golfer, currently playing on the PGA Tour Champions, who achieved 14 victories on the PGA Tour, including a major championship, the 1983 PGA Championship, and the 1983 Tournament Players Championship. Sutton was also the PGA Tour's leading money winner in 1983 and named Player of the Year.

Professional career
Born and raised in Shreveport, Louisiana, Sutton was a promising player at its Centenary College, and was named Golf Magazines 1980 College Player of the Year. At Centenary, Sutton won 14 golf tournaments, was an All American, led the Gents to the NCAA Tournament, and finished ninth nationally. He quickly established himself as one of the PGA Tour's top young stars in the early 1980s. His first win was at the 1982 Walt Disney World Golf Classic in a playoff with Bill Britton after the two had tied at 19-under-par 269 after 72 holes.

Sutton's most notable year came in 1983, when he won the Tournament Players Championship in March, followed by his only major title, the PGA Championship at Riviera in August. He entered into a long drought shortly thereafter, going from 1987 to 1994 without a PGA Tour victory. He nearly lost his tour card late in the string, maintaining it only by using a one-time-only exemption for players in the top 50 of the all-time PGA Tour career money list. After this disappointing eight years, Sutton rejuvenated his career in 1995 with a win at the B.C. Open.

In 1998, Sutton won the Valero Texas Open and the prestigious Tour Championship to finish fifth on the PGA Tour money list. Other than his spectacular 1983 season, Sutton had his best year to date in 2000 by beating Tiger Woods in the final group of The Players Championship to win. He also had an additional win to that—the Greater Greensboro Chrysler Classic two starts later. He would go on to finish fourth on the PGA Tour money list. In 2001, Sutton made the cut in 22 of 26 events with one victory at the Shell Houston Open at TPC at The Woodlands and a season winnings total of $1.7 million.

Sutton ranked in the top 10 of the Official World Golf Rankings for over 50 weeks from their debut in 1986 to 1987 and then again for over 50 weeks between 1999 and 2001. He has reached the top five of the rankings.

After playing on four U.S. Ryder Cup teams (1985, 1987, 1999, 2002), he was named non-playing captain of the team for 2004. The competition, played at Oakland Hills Country Club, saw Europe beat the US by 18½ to 9½ points. Inevitably, Sutton came in for some criticism of his performance as captain, especially for his decision to pair Tiger Woods with Phil Mickelson on the first day of play.

In 2007, Sutton received the Payne Stewart Award for his charitable efforts, which include the establishment of the Christus Schumpert Sutton Children's Hospital in his hometown of Shreveport. He also teamed up with Louisianans Kelly Gibson and David Toms to raise more than $2 million in aid to Hurricane Katrina and Hurricane Rita victims. Sutton was also awarded the Omar N. Bradley Spirit of Independence Award in 2004 and the Golf Writers Association of America's 2006 Charlie Bartlett Award with Gibson and Toms for their relief efforts. 

Sutton became eligible to play on the Champions Tour in April 2008 and his best finish is a tie for third at the Outback Steakhouse Pro-Am in 2009.

Personal life
Sutton has four children.

Amateur wins (6)
1974 Louisiana Junior Amateur
1979 Western Amateur
1980 North and South Amateur, U.S. Amateur, Western Amateur, Northeast Amateur, Eisenhower Trophy medalist

Professional wins (15)
PGA Tour wins (14)PGA Tour playoff record (4–2)Other wins (1)Other playoff record (1–0)Major championships

Wins (1)

Results timeline

LA = Low amateur
CUT = missed the half way cut
"T" indicates a tie for a place.

Summary

Most consecutive cuts made – 5 (twice)
Longest streak of top-10s – 2 (1999 U.S. Open – 1999 Open Championship)

The Players Championship
Wins (2)

Results timeline

CUT = missed the halfway cut
WD = withdrew
"T" indicates a tie for a place.

Results in World Golf Championships

1Cancelled due to 9/11

QF, R16, R32, R64 = Round in which player lost in match play
"T" = Tied
NT = No tournament

U.S. national team appearancesAmateurWalker Cup: 1979 (winners), 1981 (winners)
Eisenhower Trophy: 1980 (team winners and individual leader)Professional'
USA vs. Japan: 1983
Ryder Cup: 1985, 1987, 1999 (winners), 2002, 2004 (captain)
Nissan Cup: 1986
Presidents Cup: 1998 (withdrew), 2000 (winners)
UBS Cup: 2003 (tie), 2004 (winners)

See also
Fall 1981 PGA Tour Qualifying School graduates
List of men's major championships winning golfers

References

External links

American male golfers
PGA Tour golfers
PGA Tour Champions golfers
Ryder Cup competitors for the United States
Winners of men's major golf championships
Golfers from Shreveport, Louisiana
Centenary College of Louisiana alumni
Sportspeople from Bossier City, Louisiana
1958 births
Living people